Orsinval is a commune in the Nord department in northern France.

Heraldry

See also
Communes of the Nord department

References

External links
 Official website

Communes of Nord (French department)